High Ongar is a village and civil parish in the County of Essex, England. It is located a mile (1½ km) north-east of Chipping Ongar, 8 miles (13 km) west of Chelmsford and 6 miles (10 km) north-west of Brentwood.

The village of High Ongar has existed since the beginning of the 17th century, although in the Middle Ages it was probably no more than a tiny hamlet. The oldest surviving house in the village is the timber-framed and weather-boarded building immediately east of the church, known as Post Office Cottages. This dates from the late 16th or early 17th century and may have been built as the rectory. Part of it was at one time used as a "lock-up".

The most prominent building within High Ongar's Conservation Area is the parish church of St. Mary the Virgin, which is listed Grade I. The church dates from the mid-12th century although it was extended and restored in the 19th century. Thomas Chase, former Lord Chancellor of Ireland and Chancellor of Oxford (died 1449) spent his last years as vicar here.

Other listed buildings in the area include: High Ongar Primary School (1871); the Forrester's Arms (late 18th century); the Cucina Italiana (opened in September 2014) formerly The Red Lion (mid-17th century); Sanuk Thai restaurant (mid-17th century) formerly the Rectory built in 1767 by Edward Earle; and Nos.1, 2 and 3 Blacksmiths' cottages (late 17th century).

References

External links 

 High Ongar Parish Council
  High Ongar Primary School
  St. Mary's Church, High Ongar (part of the  Parish of High Ongar)

Villages in Essex
Epping Forest District